Vasek Pospisil and Jack Sock defeated the defending champions Bob and Mike Bryan in the final, 7–6(7–5), 6–7(3–7), 6–4, 3–6, 7–5 to win the gentlemen's doubles title at the 2014 Wimbledon Championships.

Seeds

  Bob Bryan /  Mike Bryan (final)
  Alexander Peya /  Bruno Soares (quarterfinals)
  Daniel Nestor /  Nenad Zimonjić (quarterfinals)
  Julien Benneteau /  Édouard Roger-Vasselin (quarterfinals)
  Leander Paes /  Radek Štěpánek (semifinals)
  Marcel Granollers /  Marc López (third round)
  Łukasz Kubot /  Robert Lindstedt (second round)
  Rohan Bopanna /  Aisam-ul-Haq Qureshi (second round)
  Julian Knowle /  Marcelo Melo (quarterfinals)
  Treat Huey /  Dominic Inglot (first round)
  Jean-Julien Rojer /  Horia Tecău (third round)
  Michaël Llodra /  Nicolas Mahut (semifinals)
  Eric Butorac /  Raven Klaasen (third round)
  Jamie Murray /  John Peers (third round)
  Juan Sebastián Cabal /  Marcin Matkowski (third round)
  Pablo Cuevas /  David Marrero (third round)

Qualifying

Draw

Finals

Top half

Section 1

Section 2

Bottom half

Section 3

Section 4

References

External links

2014 Wimbledon Championships – Men's draws and results at the International Tennis Federation

Men's Doubles
Wimbledon Championship by year – Men's doubles